John Williston Cook (April 20, 1844 – July 15, 1922) was a prominent educator during the late nineteenth and early twentieth centuries in the United States, specifically in Illinois. His work in education, specifically in association with the Herbartianism movement, had a lasting impact on the field at the time.

Early life 
Cook was born on April 20, 1844, in Oneida County, New York. He moved to McLean County, Illinois, with his family in 1851. He attended Illinois State Normal University prior to his time as a faculty member, graduating in 1865. He taught for one year in Brimfield, Illinois, before returning to Normal and becoming the principal of the model school associated with ISNU. In 1867 he became married to Lydia Spafford.

Professor and university president

Illinois State University 
In 1868, Cook joined the ISNU faculty as the professor of history and geography. In 1869, he became the professor of reading and elocution, and in 1876 was made the professor of mathematics. In 1890, Cook was appointed president of the university. As president, Cook advocated for the construction of a gymnasium on campus, and in 1895 the Illinois legislature appropriated $40,000 for the construction of the gymnasium,  later renamed John W. Cook Hall. Cook was president of the university when it broke its tradition of free tuition and instituted a fee of two dollars per term starting in December 1898. Cook resigned from ISNU in 1899.

Herbartianism at Illinois State Normal University 
By 1890, ISNU became the national center of Herbartianism, a pedagogical movement of reform for education in elementary schools. Cook encouraged ISNU graduates, both of the university and model school, to continue their education beyond the campus in order to strengthen their training as teachers, and heavily supported the faculty’s study of Herbartianism. Students such as Frank Morton McMurry, Charles Alexander McMurry and Charles DeGarmo took Cook's advice and studied abroad in Halle and Jena, Germany.

In 1893, the Normal Pedagogical Club was founded and Cook was elected president, while Charles McMurry served as secretary. This club, along with the Herbart Club

Cook's lack of discrimination of educational theories and practices facilitated the growth of Herbartianism at ISNU. In an 1898 letter to David Felmley, Cook stated, "As to whether I am a Herbartian or not, is a matter of no consequence of course. In some respects I find myself greatly influenced by his [Herbart] ideas, while in other directions I find myself not aroused at all."

Northern Illinois University 
In 1899, Cook began his career at the Dekalb Normal School, which would later become Northern Illinois University. He served as president of NIU from 1899 to 1919. He was essential to the organization of the school, the hiring of the first faculty members, and establishing the base curriculum for students.

Later life and death 
Cook wrote the book Educational History of Illinois, published in 1912, which strongly featured ISNU. Cook died on July 15, 1922, in Chicago, Illinois.  Cook is buried in Evergreen Memorial Cemetery located in Bloomington, Illinois.

Legacy 
There is a building named after Cook on the Illinois State University Campus, John W. Cook Hall, which is used predominantly by the School of Music. There is also a building on Northern Illinois University’s Campus, Williston Hall, named in his honor.

References

External links 
 John W. Cook Presidential Papers, 1862–1969 | Dr. JoAnn Rayfield Archives at Illinois State University
 John Cook | Milner Library – Illinois State University
 Inventory of the President's Papers at Northern Illinois University
 John Williston Cook (1844–1922) – Find A Grave Memorial

1844 births
1922 deaths
19th-century American educators
20th-century American educators
American academic administrators
People from Oneida County, New York
Illinois State University alumni
Illinois State University faculty
Northern Illinois University people
Writers from Illinois